Silo, previously titled Wool, is an upcoming science fiction streaming television series created and written by Graham Yost and directed by Morten Tyldum and based on the Silo series of novels by author Hugh Howey. The series stars Rebecca Ferguson, who also executive produces the series, and is set to premiere on Apple TV+ on May 5, 2023.

Premise
In a toxic dystopian future where a community exists in a giant silo hundreds of stories deep underground, men and women live in a society full of regulations they believe are meant to protect them.

Cast and characters
 Rebecca Ferguson as Juliette
 Tim Robbins as Bernard
 Common as Sims
 Harriet Walter as Martha Walker
 Chinaza Uche as Paul Billings
 Avi Nash as Lukas Kyle
 David Oyelowo as Holston
 Rashida Jones as Allison
 Ferdinand Kingsley as George Wilkins
 Iain Glen as Dr. Pete Nichols
 Shane McRae as Knox
 Matt Gomez Hidaka as Cooper
 Rick Gomez as Patrick Kennedy
 Lee Drage as Franky Brown
 Henry Garrett as Douglas Trumbull
 Will Merrick as Danny
 Paul Herzberg as Kilroy

Episodes

Production

Development
The project was first announced as being in development as a feature film at 20th Century Fox, who entered negotiations to acquire the self-published e-book Wool by Hugh Howey on May 11, 2012. Five days later, it was confirmed that 20th Century Fox had acquired the rights to the novel, with Ridley Scott and Steven Zaillian among those attached to produce the film. On November 28, 2012, it was announced that J Blakeson was in negotiations to write and direct the film. It was later announced on June 5, 2015, that Nicole Perlman was hired to rewrite the screenplay, with Blakeson no longer involved in the project. The film was ultimately shelved as a result of the acquisition of 21st Century Fox by Disney.

On July 30, 2018, it was announced that a new iteration of the project was in development for television at AMC, with LaToya Morgan attached to write the adaptation under her overall deal at AMC Studios. The series eventually moved to Apple TV+ on May 20, 2021, with the project receiving a series order consisting of 10 episodes. Graham Yost was attached to replace Morgan as creator and writer, marking his third series at Apple TV+ under his overall deal with the network. Morten Tyldum was also attached to direct and executive produce the series, with Yost serving as showrunner.

Casting
Alongside the series order announcement, it was also announced that Rebecca Ferguson was cast in a lead role. In August 2021, Tim Robbins was added to the cast. Rashida Jones, David Oyelowo, Common, Harriet Walter, Avi Nash and Chinaza Uche joined the cast in the following months.

Filming
Principal photography began in late August 2021 in Hoddesdon, Hertfordshire and is scheduled to last until spring 2022.

Release
Silo is scheduled to be released on Apple TV+ on May 5, 2023, with the first two episodes available immediately and the rest debuting on a weekly basis until June 30.

References

External links
 
 

2020s American drama television series
2020s American science fiction television series
Apple TV+ original programming
Dystopian television series
English-language television shows
Television series based on American novels
Television series set in the future
Television shows filmed in England
Upcoming drama television series